1240 Centenaria, provisional designation , is a background asteroid from the outer regions of the asteroid belt, approximately  in diameter. It was discovered on 5 February 1932, by astronomer Richard Schorr at the Bergedorf Observatory in Hamburg, Germany. The assumed C-type asteroid has a rotation period of 11.3 hours. It was named for the 100th anniversary of the discovering observatory.

Orbit and classification 

Centenaria is a non-family asteroid from the main belt's background population. It orbits the Sun in the outer asteroid belt at a distance of 2.4–3.4 AU once every 4 years and 10 months (1,773 days; semi-major axis of 2.87 AU). Its orbit has an eccentricity of 0.18 and an inclination of 10° with respect to the ecliptic. The body's observation arc begins at Lowell Observatory in December 1930, or 14 months prior to its official discovery observation at Bergedorf.

Naming 

This minor planet was named Centenaria to celebrate the 100th anniversary of the discovering Bergedorf Observatory on 31 October 1933. The official  was mentioned in The Names of the Minor Planets by Paul Herget in 1955.

Physical characteristics 

Centenaria is an assumed carbonaceous C-type asteroid. The asteroid's determined geometric albedo agrees with a characterization into the C-complex (see below).

Rotation period 

In July 2007, a rotational lightcurve of Centenaria was obtained from photometric observations by Julian Oey at the Kingsgrove Observatory  in Australia. Lightcurve analysis gave a rotation period of  hours with a brightness variation of 0.20 magnitude. The result supersedes previous period determinations of 11.2 hours with and amplitude of 0.12 by Laurent Bernasconi in March 2005, and a period of 14 hours by Mario Di Martino at Pino Torinese in September 1983.

Diameter and albedo 

According to the surveys carried out by the Infrared Astronomical Satellite IRAS, the Japanese Akari satellite and the NEOWISE mission of NASA's Wide-field Infrared Survey Explorer, Centenaria measures between 50 and 71 kilometers in diameter and its surface has an albedo between 0.046 and 0.072. The Collaborative Asteroid Lightcurve Link derives an albedo of 0.0469 and a diameter of 58.61 kilometers based on an absolute magnitude of 10.1.

References

External links 
 Asteroid Lightcurve Database (LCDB), query form (info )
 Dictionary of Minor Planet Names, Google books
 Asteroids and comets rotation curves, CdR – Observatoire de Genève, Raoul Behrend
 Discovery Circumstances: Numbered Minor Planets (1)-(5000) – Minor Planet Center
 
 

001240
Discoveries by Richard Schorr
Named minor planets
19320205